The women's 52 kilograms (half lightweight) competition at the 2014 Asian Games in Incheon was held on 20 September at the Dowon Gymnasium.

Schedule
All times are Korea Standard Time (UTC+09:00)

Results
Legend
WO — Won by walkover

Main bracket

Repechage

References

External links
 
 Official website

W52
Judo at the Asian Games Women's Half Lightweight
Asian W52